Nimo (Nimo-Wasawai) is a Left May language of Papua New Guinea, in Sandaun Province. Nimo and Wasawai are two of the villages inhabited by speakers of this language. It is close to Nakwi.

It is spoken in Arakau, Binuto, Didipas, Fowiom, Nimo, Uburu, Uwawi, Wamwiu, Wasuai, and Yuwaitri villages, some of which are located in Nino ward, Tunap/Hunstein Rural LLG, East Sepik Province.

References

Left May languages
Languages of Sandaun Province